Turna is an Kamboj clan name found in the Punjab region of India and Pakistan as well as Turkey amongst the Turkish people. In Punjab, the Turnas are found as Sikhs, Hindus as well as the Muslims.

References

External links 
 to see details of gotras

Social groups of Punjab, India
Social groups of Pakistan